Central Fire Station is a historic fire station located at Schenectady in Schenectady County, New York, USA. It was built between 1924 and 1929 and is a three-story, brick civic building in the Georgian Revival style. The front facade is dominated by a broad, five bay central pavilion. The first floor of the front facade is composed of five segmentally arched entrance bays faced with cast stone. The Schenectady Fire Department ceased using the building in 1981.

It was added to the National Register of Historic Places in 1985.

References

Fire stations on the National Register of Historic Places in New York (state)
Georgian Revival architecture in New York (state)
Fire stations completed in 1929
Buildings and structures in Schenectady County, New York
Defunct fire stations in New York (state)
National Register of Historic Places in Schenectady County, New York